Trichoserixia rondoni is a species of beetle in the family Cerambycidae, and the only species in the genus Trichoserixia. It was described by Breuning in 1965.

References

Desmiphorini
Beetles described in 1965
Monotypic beetle genera